John Simpson (27 October 1918 – 21 June 2000) was an English-born footballer who played as a left back in The Football League in the 1940s and 1950s.

After playing as an amateur for Hull City reserves, he started his league career with Huddersfield Town and then moved to York City, first playing for them in 1947–48. He went on to play over 200 games for the Minstermen.  He retired through injury in 1954.

During the war, John was in the Army Physical Training Corps and guested for Plymouth Argyle, Bournemouth & Boscombe Athletic, Portsmouth, Southampton, Leyton Orient, Aldershot and Leeds United.

After a spell out of the game, he spent 9 years coaching at Hull City before moving to Hartlepool United as coach. In April 1970 he was appointed manager of Football League Fourth Division side Hartlepool, and he remained as manager until March 1971.

In 1971, he joined Cambridge United United and helped them to 2 promotion successes.

In summer 1977, he was appointed physiotherapist at York City. He retired in May 1983 after a testimonial game against Leeds United.

References

1918 births
English footballers
Footballers from Kingston upon Hull
2000 deaths
Association football fullbacks
English Football League players
Bridlington Trinity F.C. players
Huddersfield Town A.F.C. players
York City F.C. players
Grantham Town F.C. players
English football managers
English Football League managers
Hartlepool United F.C. managers
People from Hedon
York City F.C. non-playing staff